Savitree Amitrapai (born 19 November 1988) is a Thai badminton player. She competed at the 2016 Summer Olympics in Rio de Janeiro, Brazil.

Achievements

Asian Championships 
Women's doubles

Southeast Asian Games 
Women's doubles

Mixed doubles

Summer Universiade 
Women's doubles

Mixed doubles

BWF World Tour 
The BWF World Tour, which was announced on 19 March 2017 and implemented in 2018, is a series of elite badminton tournaments sanctioned by the Badminton World Federation (BWF). The BWF World Tour is divided into levels of World Tour Finals, Super 1000, Super 750, Super 500, Super 300 (part of the HSBC World Tour), and the BWF Tour Super 100.

Mixed doubles

BWF Grand Prix 
The BWF Grand Prix had two levels, the Grand Prix and Grand Prix Gold. It was a series of badminton tournaments sanctioned by the Badminton World Federation (BWF) and played between 2007 and 2017.

Women's doubles

Mixed doubles

  BWF Grand Prix Gold tournament
  BWF Grand Prix tournament

BWF International Challenge/Series 
Women's doubles

Mixed doubles

  BWF International Challenge tournament
  BWF International Series tournament

References

External links 
 
 

1988 births
Living people
Savitree Amitrapai
Savitree Amitrapai
Badminton players at the 2016 Summer Olympics
Savitree Amitrapai
Badminton players at the 2010 Asian Games
Badminton players at the 2014 Asian Games
Savitree Amitrapai
Asian Games medalists in badminton
Medalists at the 2010 Asian Games
Competitors at the 2009 Southeast Asian Games
Competitors at the 2011 Southeast Asian Games
Competitors at the 2013 Southeast Asian Games
Competitors at the 2017 Southeast Asian Games
Competitors at the 2019 Southeast Asian Games
Savitree Amitrapai
Savitree Amitrapai
Southeast Asian Games medalists in badminton
Savitree Amitrapai
Savitree Amitrapai
Universiade medalists in badminton
Medalists at the 2011 Summer Universiade
Medalists at the 2013 Summer Universiade
Savitree Amitrapai
Savitree Amitrapai